Arjun Jang Bahadur Singh is a Nepalese politician. He was elected to the Pratinidhi Sabha in the 1999 election on behalf of the Nepali Congress.

Singh was the NC candidate in the Bahjang-1 constituency for the 2008 Constituent Assembly election.

References

Living people
Nepali Congress politicians from Sudurpashchim Province
Year of birth missing (living people)
Nepal MPs 1991–1994
Nepal MPs 1999–2002